Scots may refer to:

People and cultures
 Scots language
 Scottish people
 Scoti, a Latin name for the Gaels

Other uses
 SCOTS, abbreviation for Royal Regiment of Scotland
 Scottish Corpus of Texts and Speech (SCOTS), a linguistic resource
 Southern Culture on the Skids (SCOTS), an American rock band
 Scot's Lo-Cost, a grocery store owned by Weis Markets

See also
 Scotch (disambiguation) 
 Scots Church (disambiguation)
 Scots College (disambiguation) 
 Scott's (disambiguation)
 Scottish (disambiguation)
 Scotts (disambiguation)
 Pound Scots, historical currency
 Scots pine, a species of tree 

Language and nationality disambiguation pages